A Turn of the Wheel is Rawlins Cross' debut album, released in 1989 on the Ground Swell label.

Track listing
All songs are traditional arrangements, unless otherwise noted.

"Wild Rose" (Dave Panting) - 3:29
"Farmer's Daughter/ High Reel" - 2:15
"A Turn of the Wheel" (Geoff Panting) - 3:36
"Mountainside" (D. Panting) - 2:40
"MacPherson's Lament" - 3:30
"Colleen" (D. Panting) - 4:04
"Mac's Fancy/ Give Me a Drink of Water" - 2:55
"Shaken Up" (G. Panting) - 2:56
"Ghost of Love" (D. Panting) - 3:10
"Sleepy Maggie/ Gravel Walk/ Little Beggarman" - 2:56

Personnel

Rawlins Cross

Dave Panting - guitar, vocals
Ian McKinnon - bagpipes, trumpet, tin whistle, vocals
Geoff Panting - keyboards, vocals
Lorne Taylor - bass
Pamela Paton - drums

Studio Musicians
Kathy Phippard - backing vocals
Glenn Tilley - backing vocals
Sean Panting - backing vocals

Production
Glen Tilley - producer
Terry Windsor - engineer
Deryk Wenaus - typography
Manfred Buchheit - photography

1989 albums
Rawlins Cross albums